Zenon: Z3 is a 2004 film directed by Steve Rash and starring Kirsten Storms, Raven-Symoné, and Lauren Maltby. It is the third and final installment of the Disney Channel's Zenon television film trilogy, following Zenon: Girl of the 21st Century (1999) and Zenon: The Zequel (2001).

Plot

The year is 2054 and Zenon Kar is now 18. She is competing to win the Galactic Teen Supreme contest, which ends with a celebration on the Moon. The Moonstock festival. Zenon wants to beat the handsome Bronley Hale. Sage Borealis, the Moon preservation activist is there. Sage is fighting to keep the Moon from being colonized. Sage asks Zenon to help.

Commander Edward Plank and Aunt Judy Cling have a foster daughter. Her name is Dasha. Dasha is starstruck with Zenon. Dasha is often getting into trouble. The moon guardian Selene appears. Selene threatens to destroy the Earth. Zenon and the other racers try to save everyone from Selene.

Zenon, Sage, Dasha along with their friends Margie, Cassie, and Bronley team up to save the day. They evacuate everyone, even passengers in the Proto Zoa's tour bus. When they try to remove the Moon Dome, with each taking a hover pod, the dome is too heavy to be lifted.

Commander Plank and Aunt Judy have been looking for Dasha. When they find her, they decide to help the group. They help lift the dome. The dome is set off to drift into space. Even so, Selene destroys the rest of the base. Selene waves goodbye as the friends return to Earth. The wild weather caused by Selene has stopped.

In the end, Sage and Zenon become close. Protozoa's band Microbe and a new band, Cosmic Blush, hold a concert together. Numbar invites Zenon to be a contestant in a new contest. There is a new colony on the planet Mars. Will Mars (the guardian of the planet Mars) be angered?

Cast
 Kirsten Storms as Zenon Kar
 Lauren Maltby as Margie Hammond
 Raven-Symoné as Nebula Wade
 Alyson Morgan as Dasha Plank
 Stuart Pankin as Commander Edward Plank
 Holly Fulger as Aunt Judy Cling-Plank
 Glenn McMillan as Bronley Hale
 Ben Easter as Sage Borealis
 Nathan Anderson as Proto Zoa
 Damon Berry as Pat Numbar
 Phumi Mthembu as Cassie
 Joanna Evans as Young Selena
 Carol Reynolds as Selena
 Nikki Joshua as Cosmic Blush

Note: Storms, Maltby, Pankin, and Fulger are the only cast members to appear in all three films in the Zenon trilogy.

Soundtrack

Track listing
Cosmic Blush & Proto Zoa - "Out of This World" – 3:40
Christy Carlson Romano - "Anyone But Me" – 3:22
April Start - "All About You" – 3:57
Miss Jess - "Some Say" – 3:19
Kristian Rex - "Supernova Girl (Z3 Remix)" – 2:40
Proto Zoa - "The Galaxy Is Ours" – 2:36
Cassiøpeia - "Plan B" – 3:00
Selena the Moon Goddess - "Lucky Star" – 3:44
The Super Novas - "Outa-Space (Instrumental)" – 3:43
Cosmic Blush & Proto Zoa - "Out of This World (Lunar Remix)" – 3:11

See also
 List of films featuring space stations

References

External links
 

Zenon
American science fiction comedy films
Moon in film
Television sequel films
2000s English-language films
2004 television films
2004 films
Disney Channel Original Movie films
Films set in 2054
Films directed by Steve Rash
American science fiction television films
2000s science fiction comedy films
2000s American films